Howard P. Boyd  (November 2, 1914 – December 20, 2011) was an entomologist, botanist, editor, teacher, photographer, filmmaker, writer, and naturalist, best known for his close association with the Pine Barrens of New Jersey spanning more than 70 years.

Background 

Born in Boston, Massachusetts, in 1914, Boyd spent much of his early life on small farms in three suburban communities northeast of the city. An avid Boy Scout, by the time of his graduation from high school in Billerica, Massachusetts, in 1932, he had earned every nature merit badge in the Boy Scout Handbook.

He attended the University of New Hampshire for two years before transferring to Boston University, where he received a bachelor of science degree in biological sciences with an emphasis in botany (1938). A lifelong learner with a fascination for the biological and natural sciences, he later earned a master of science degree in entomology from the University of Delaware (1979).

Career 
Shortly after his graduation from Boston University, Boyd went to work for the Boy Scouts of America (BSA), moving with his wife, Doris (nee Fowler), to the Philadelphia area in 1938. He had his first exposure to the New Jersey Pine Barrens through numerous insect collecting trips in the fall of that year. In 1969, after 31 years as an executive with BSA, he retired, at which time he became increasingly active in his two primary areas of interest: the Pine Barrens and entomology.

Following his retirement, Boyd became prolific as an educator, conservationist, and writer. With Doris as photographer, from 1966–1976 the Boyds produced and presented films through the National Audubon Society Wildlife Film Tours. From 1970-1990, he was an instructor at the Conservation and Environmental Studies Center (now known as the Pinelands Institute for Natural and Environmental Studies) at historic Whitesbog Village, then sponsored by Glassboro State College. In the late 1980s and early ’90s, he was an adjunct instructor at the college, developing and teaching a course on the ecology of the Pine Barrens. He was a lecturer on Pine Barrens ecology for both Burlington County College (1990s) and the Pinelands Teacher Institute run by Pinelands Preservation Alliance (PPA; late 1990s to early 2000s). He was renowned and sought after for his workshops and field trips focusing on diverse aspects of Pine Barrens biology, ecology, and conservation.

Boyd's reputation as an educator and conservationist was closely tied to his work as a scientist and researcher. Beginning in 1974, he spent nearly 30 years as the editor of the serial scientific publication, Entomological News, published by the American Entomological Society (AES), and he served as president of the AES from 1977–1981. For much of his adult life he was considered one of the U.S.’s leading experts on tiger beetles, a significant focus of his entomological research. He served as vice president and executive board member of the New Jersey Audubon Society (NJAS) from 1975–1983, and as chair of NJAS's Advisory Committee for the Rancocas Nature Center, which he helped establish, from 1977–1980. He was president of the Burlington County Natural Sciences Club from 1988–1990. Beginning in 1989 he served as a trustee of PPA.

In 1980, Boyd was presented with the Paul S. Battersby Award by the Audubon Wildlife Society. In 1989, he was presented with the Silver Beaver Award by the Camden County Council, BSA. In 2002, he was presented with the Medal of the Garden Club of New Jersey (GCNJ), the organization's highest honor. In 2004, he was one of two premiere inductees into the Pine Barrens Hall of Fame, established by PPA to honor heroes of Pine Barrens protection. In 2009 he was honored for his leadership in New Jersey Pinelands conservation and education at the 4th annual Lines in the Pines symposium.

Howard and Doris Boyd, who predeceased him in 2009 at age 94, were married for over 70 years and were survived by two children, five grandchildren, and eleven great-grandchildren. The couple were longtime residents of Tabernacle, New Jersey, Burlington County, within the Protection Area of the Pinelands National Reserve. At the time of his death at age 97, on December 20, 2011, Howard P. Boyd was celebrated for his influential work in educating the public on the importance of protecting the New Jersey Pine Barrens from the dangers of human development.

Books by Howard P. Boyd 
Boyd was the author of four books about the New Jersey Pine Barrens. His first book, A Field Guide to the Pine Barrens of New Jersey: Its Flora, Fauna, Ecology and Historic Sites (Plexus Publishing, Inc., 1991), with illustrations by Mary Pat Finelli, is currently in its sixth printing and is recognized as the most authoritative and widely referenced field guide to New Jersey Pinelands flora and fauna.

His other books are A Pine Barrens Odyssey: A Naturalist’s Year in the Pine Barrens of New Jersey (Plexus, 1997), Wildflowers of the Pine Barrens of New Jersey (Plexus, 2001), and The Ecological Pine Barrens of New Jersey: An Ecosystem Threatened by Fragmentation (Plexus, 2008). The impact of Boyd's books in raising awareness of the New Jersey Pine Barrens ecosystem both regionally and nationally has been significant.

A Field Guide to the Pine Barrens of New Jersey: Its Flora, Fauna, Ecology and Historic Sites (1991) 
A Pine Barrens Odyssey: A Naturalist’s Year in the Pine Barrens of New Jersey (1997) 
Wildflowers of the Pine Barrens of New Jersey (2001) 
The Ecological Pine Barrens of New Jersey: An Ecosystem Threatened by Fragmentation (2008) Hardback:  Softback:

Articles and scientific papers by Howard P. Boyd 

Collecting Tiger Beetles in the Pine Barrens of New Jersey. Cicindela 5(1): 1-12; 3/1973	

Stalking the “Tigers” of the Delaware Valley. Frontiers 37(3):  12-17; 4/1973	

Overlapping Ranges of Cicindela dorsalis dorsalis and C. d. media. with notes on the Calvert Cliffs area, Maryland.  Cicindela 7(3):  55-60; 9/1975
	
A Bird Lore Primer. Scouting 64(2):  26-27, 56-58; 3/4/76	

Tiger Beetles (Coleoptera:  Cicindelidae) of New Jersey, with special reference to their Ecological Relationships. Trans. Amer. Entomol. Soc. 104(2): 191-242; 8/1978	

Flying Tigers. New Jersey Audubon 5(1): 11-14; W/1979

Insect Calendar.  New Jersey Audubon 5(1): 21; W/1979

Insect Calendar.  New Jersey Audubon 5(2):  18; Sp/1979

Insect Calendar.  New Jersey Audubon 5(3): 22; Su/1979

Insect Calendar.  New Jersey Audubon 5(4): 21; A/1979

Arthropods of the (N.J.) Pine Barrens (with P.E. Marucci). In:  Forman, R.T.T. (ed.), Pine Barrens Ecosystem and Landscape. Chap. 29, pp. 505–525. Academic Press; Sp/1979

Intraspecific and Geographic Variations in Cicindela dorsalis Say (Coleoptera: Cicindelidae) (with R.W. Rust). Coleop. Bull. 36(2): 221-239; 6/1982	

Annotated Checklist of Cicindelidae. The Tiger Beetles of North and Central America and the West Indies (with Assoc's). Plexus Publishing, Inc., 31 pp.; 3/1982	

Library of The American Entomological Society and a Brief Review of the Society's Association with The Academy of Natural Sciences of Philadelphia. Entomol. News 95(4): 131-136; 9/10/84

Pitfall Trapping Cicindelidae (Coleoptera) and Abundance of Megacephala virginica and Cicindela unipunctata in the Pine Barrens of New Jersey.  Entomol. News 96(3): 105-108; 5/6/85

The Birth of “Entomological News” and a Century of Editors. Entomol. News 100(5): 207-211; 11/12/89

Twenty Year Index to the Quarterly Journal, “Cicindela” Vols. 1-20. 1969-1988; 2/1990	

Arthropods Taken in Pitfall Traps in the Pine Barrens of New Jersey. Entomol. News 106(1): 45-56; 1/1995	

Re-establishing the Validity of Cicindela scutellaris (Coleoptera:  Cicindelidae). Entomol. News 111(3): 224-226; 5/2000

References

External links 
Pinelands Preservation Alliance
Howard P. Boyd - The Piney
The Pinelands National Reserve

Pine Barrens (New Jersey)
Audubon movement
American ecologists
1914 births
2011 deaths
People from Billerica, Massachusetts
People from Tabernacle Township, New Jersey
University of Delaware alumni
20th-century American writers